The Taihiki River is a river of the Auckland Region of New Zealand's North Island. It flows generally northeast from its sources north of Patumahoe to reach the Waiuku River shortly before the latter's outflow into the Manukau Harbour. As with the Waiuku River, much of the Taihiki's length is as a wide silty estuary.

See also
List of rivers of New Zealand

References

Rivers of the Auckland Region
Rivers of New Zealand
Manukau Harbour catchment